Phi Sigma Delta, colloquially known as Phi Sig, was a fraternity established in 1909 with a predominantly Jewish membership at Columbia University. It eventually opened at least 47 chapters. The Fraternity merged with Zeta Beta Tau in 1970, retiring its original name.

History
Phi Sigma Delta was founded at Columbia University by a group of Jewish students who previously "seemed unable to find [a] proper opportunity for the campus fellowship they were seeking.". The first and founding meeting was held on November 10, 1909 at Maxwell Hyman's house at 22 Mount Morris Park West, New York. They met weekly at member homes, designing the constitution, ritual, and badge. Early in 1911 the group's new ritual was employed to usher in the first initiates. By September 1911 a two-room suite chapter home was established in Hartley Hall, a dormitory on the Columbia campus. Eight Founders were honored by the Fraternity:
 Alfred H. Iason
 William L. Berk
 Herbert L. Eisenberg
 Joseph Levy
 Herbert K. Minsky
 Joseph Shalleck
 Robert Shapiro
 Maxwell Hyman. 
The Fraternity was incorporated in the State of New York on June 1, 1912.

One of the milestones of the Fraternity came in 1934 when Phi Sigma Delta began a program to shelter German student refugees at various chapter houses around the country. Later, as America entered WWII the national manpower drain led to a standstill of the Fraternity's expansion program. Nevertheless, while some suspended operations 14 chapters continued to operate with reduced manpower. By the end of WWII, nearly 2,000 members had signed up to serve in the US armed forces. Alumni took up a special contribution to pay for memorial plaques for each chapter, noting those who had died during wartime service.

On April 6, 1959, Phi Alpha fraternity merged with Phi Sigma Delta, adding sixteen active chapters, "mostly located in the East," who were given new designations beginning with the Greek letter Phi. The Phi Alpha merger was made easier by the fact that there were only three campuses where both groups had a chapter, two of which "were readily resolved," while on the third campus, one of the groups was released to join another fraternity.

The expanded fraternity added eight more chapters in the subsequent decade, still, another merger was considered and pursued. Negotiations were successfully concluded in 1969 for Phi Sigma Delta itself to merge into the rapidly-expanding Zeta Beta Tau fraternity, finalizing that move in 1970.

At the time of its merger Phi Sigma Delta had 49 active chapter and 22 inactive chapters, with a total of 19,500 initiated (alumni and active) members.

Insignia and traditions
The badge of the Fraternity consisted of the three Greek letters  joined obliquely (~angled), in gold, with twenty-four crown pearls set into the gold letters.

The pledge pin was round, with a white palm and pyramid set into a purple background.

The official song was the Phi Sigma Delta Hymn, generally known as "We Sing To Thee, Phi Sigma Delta." It was adopted in 1930. Another song written for the fraternity, c.1923, was "Phi Sigma Delta Forever," words by Herbert Morse & Herman Block. Music by Nathan Grabin & Herman Block.

Notable alumni
Eric Berg, artist
Peter Yarrow, musician, part of Peter, Paul and Mary.

Chapters
This is the list of chapters of Phi Sigma Delta fraternity, immediately prior to its merger into Zeta Beta Tau in 1969. Unless otherwise referenced, citations taken from Baird's Manual. On three campuses, active chapters of both Phi Alpha and Phi Sigma Delta existed. Baird's says "two were easily resolved, and the other was released to join another national."

Several additional dormant Phi Alpha chapters had been on campuses where, at the merger, Phi Sigma Delta was active. It may be assumed that alumni from those groups were welcomed to join the existing Phi Sigma Delta chapters.

See also
 List of Jewish fraternities and sororities

References

External links
Guide to the University of Chicago, Phi Sigma Delta, Mu Chapter Records 1957 at the University of Chicago Special Collections Research Center

Defunct former members of the North American Interfraternity Conference
Zeta Beta Tau
Student organizations established in 1909
Historically Jewish fraternities in the United States
1909 establishments in New York City
Jewish organizations established in 1909